Stanley Frank Utley (born January 16, 1962) is an American professional golfer who has played on the PGA Tour, Nationwide Tour, and Champions Tour.

Early life and education
Utley was born and raised in Thayer, a small town in southern Missouri. He attended the University of Missouri where he was a distinguished member of the golf team, a three-time all-Big Eight selection and two-time All-American. Utley led Missouri to the Big Eight Championship in 1984. He also led the Tigers to two NCAA appearances where they placed 13th and 14th respectively, in 1983 and 1984. He turned professional in 1984 and joined the PGA Tour in 1989.

PGA Tour
Utley's sole PGA Tour victory came in 1989 at the Chattanooga Classic. He lost his PGA Tour card in 1992 and decided to play on the Nike Tour (now known as the Korn Ferry Tour). In the 1990s, he played primarily in this venue.  

Utley holds the PGA Tour record for fewest putts in nine holes, with six at the 2002 Air Canada Championship. 

As his touring career was winding down, Utley began to develop new career strategies for taking advantage of his reputation as one of the best chippers and putters in the game. He began a transition into teaching and writing with special focus on his specialty - the short game. Utley has risen to prominence as one of the best instructors in golf. 

Utley made his Champions Tour debut when he qualified for the 2012 Toshiba Classic.

Recognition and accolades
Golf Digest has called Utley one of America's 50 greatest teachers in their annual poll of more than 1,500 teaching professionals from around the country. He ranked 20th on the 2019-2020 list. His list of current and former students on the PGA, Korn Ferry, Champions and LPGA Tours includes Jay Haas, Sergio García, Joaquín Niemann, Scott Langley, Kevin Streelman, Scott Piercy, Paige Mackenzie, Amanda Blumenherst, Darren Clarke, Brandt Jobe, Rocco Mediate, Alex Norén, Inbee Park, Paul McGinley  and Bill Haas.  

Utley was elected to the University of Missouri Athletics Hall of Fame in 1995, the first golfer ever chosen. He is a man of strong Christian faith. He and wife, Elayna, have a daughter and a son. They live in Scottsdale, Arizona.

Professional wins (7)

PGA Tour wins (1)

Nike Tour wins (3)

Nike Tour playoff record (0–1)

Other wins (3)
1986 Kansas Open
1988 Missouri Open
1989 Missouri Open

Results in major championships

Note: Utley never played in the Masters Tournament or The Open Championship.

CUT = missed the half-way cut
"T" = tied

See also
1993 Nike Tour graduates

References

External links

American male golfers
Missouri Tigers men's golfers
PGA Tour golfers
PGA Tour Champions golfers
Korn Ferry Tour graduates
Golfers from Missouri
Golfers from Scottsdale, Arizona
People from Oregon County, Missouri
1962 births
Living people